Capital Futebol Clube, commonly known as Capital, is a Brazilian football club based in Palmas, Tocantins.

History

Founded on 21 May 2012 as Ricanato Futebol Clube, entered in professional league in 2014 season. in the state second division. Achieving promotion to the first division in 2015, the club was also the Tocantins U-18 champion and played in the Copa São Paulo. Changed their name to Capital FC in 2016, aiming at greater projection in the media. In 2021, Capital achieved its best campaign in the state league (3rd place).

Appearances

Is the total 5 Capital FC appearances in the Campeonato Tocantinense:

Honours

 Campeonato Tocantinense Second Division:
 Winners (1): 2019

References

External links
 

Association football clubs established in 2012
2012 establishments in Brazil
Capital
Capital